Violet is a 2021 American drama film written, directed, and co-produced by Justine Bateman in her feature film directorial debut. It stars Olivia Munn, Luke Bracey and Justin Theroux.

Violet follows Violet Morton, a 32-year old film executive who is living her life listening to her fear (“The Voice”). She has made these fear-based decisions to avoid potential “worst-case scenarios” in her romantic life, her family life, and her professional life. These decisions have taken her away from who she really is. She has grown accustomed to not being quite herself, and sees nothing amiss, until a friend’s comment makes her realize that The Voice has been lying to her, her entire life.

It had its world premiere at South by Southwest on March 18, 2021. It was released in theaters in a limited release on October 29, 2021, prior to video on demand on November 9, 2021, by Relativity Media and Rogue Pictures.

Plot
Violet (Olivia Munn) works as the head of production for a film company and is incredibly successful. However due to a perpetual voice in her head (Justin Theroux) she finds herself deeply insecure.

The Voice (a male one, representing Violet's negative thoughts) consistently guides Violet's career and personal decisions and discourages her from confiding in her friends. When Violet runs into Martin Woods, her ex-boyfriend of seven years ago, The Voice tells her that Martin finds her stupid and encourages her to insult him to level the playing field.

Later on, at work, Violet's boss, Tom Gaines, compliments her on her work and recalls a project she had worked on earlier, Fox Run, an experimental film based on a book of poetry. When Violet opens up about what she loves about the project he initially seems receptive, but later uses the information to denigrate her, revealing he will never back the film.

Violet later confides to her childhood friend Red she is afraid of doing things wrong as it leaves her feeling unsafe and he encourages her to make mistakes.

Violet begins defying The Voice. She reaches out to Martin to apologize for being rude to him and he forgives her and also apologizes for his role in their breakup. She decides to ignore the calls from the powerful film executive she had been seeing and begins a relationship with Red.

When Tom Gaines humiliates Violet at work by revealing that she was sleeping with the executive, Violet pushes back telling him she is responsible for the success of his company. When he fires her, she immediately reaches out to financiers she knows who are looking to expand into production, and is able to become their President of Production. The new company is enthusiastic about Fox Run and Violet works to make it her next film.

Just as things seem to be going well for Violet, she learns that her estranged mother has died. While she initially books a flight to go to the funeral, Violet realizes that there is no reason to go back, as the majority of her family is cruel and abusive towards her.

Violet's brother calls her to confront her for missing the funeral, and she finally cuts him off. The Voice tells Violet she will be alone forever and then die. Violet realizes the voice is lying; she is finally free.

Cast

Production
In March 2018,  Olivia Munn and Justin Theroux had joined the cast of the film, with Justine Bateman directing from a screenplay she wrote. In July 2019, Luke Bracey joined the cast of the film. In August 2019, Jason Dohring, Zachary Gordon and Laura San Giacomo joined the cast of the film. In September 2019, Todd Stashwick joined the cast of the film.

Principal photography began in August 2019.

Release
Violet had its world premiere at South by Southwest on March 18, 2021. It was previously set to hold its premiere at the festival the year before; however, it was cancelled due to the COVID-19 pandemic. In July 2021, Relativity Media acquired U.S. distribution rights to the film. The Exchange handled foreign sales for the film.

It had its international premiere at the 2021 Toronto International Film Festival on September 9, 2021. It was released in a limited release on October 29, 2021, prior to video on demand on November 9, 2021.

Reception 
On Rotten Tomatoes, the film has an approval rating of 81% based on 75 reviews, with an average rating of 7/10. The website's critics consensus reads: "Uneven yet admirably ambitious, Violet takes a thoughtful look at the occasionally profound difference between a person's private thoughts and public face."

References

External links

Films postponed due to the COVID-19 pandemic
American drama films
American independent films
2021 directorial debut films
Films about Hollywood, Los Angeles
2021 drama films
2021 independent films
Relativity Media films
Films directed by Justine Bateman
2020s English-language films
2020s American films